The 44th Annual Annie Awards honoring excellence in the field of animation of 2016 took place on February 4, 2017, at the University of California, Los Angeles's Royce Hall in Los Angeles, California, presenting in 36 categories.

Production categories
On November 28, 2016, the nominations for Annie Awards were announced. Zootopia earned the most number of nominations with 11, followed by Kubo and the Two Strings with 10.

Individual achievement categories

Juried awards

Multiple awards and nominations

Films

The following films received multiple nominations:

The following films received multiple awards:

Television/Broadcast

The following television productions received multiple nominations:

The following television productions received multiple awards:

References

External links
 Complete list of 44th Annual Annie Awards nominees

2016
2016 film awards
Annie
Annie